Atlantic Ocean is the Dutch trance/electronic duo, comprising Lex van Coeverden (born November 28, 1970) and Rene van der Weyde (born 10 August 1971).

The duo is most remembered for the hit single, "Waterfall". Five of their singles charted on the UK Singles Chart in the 1990s: "Waterfall", "Body in Motion", "Music Is a Passion", a remix of "Waterfall" and "The Cycle of Life". Further releases of "Waterfall" were made, though either failed or were ineligible for the chart. The band released several EPs including Lorelei, Pegasus, Set You Free and Trance-Atlantis. Ben Liebrand was responsible for making the 3D-animated videoclip for "Trance-Atlantis".

"Waterfall"
The duo's first and most successful track was "Waterfall". It was originally released as a single in 1993. It is included on many Ministry of Sound compilation albums. In the track's original single release, three versions of the song were included. These were a radio edit, a tranquil mix and an original 12" edition.

The single reached number 22 on the UK Singles Chart in February 1994. A remixed version achieved one place better, peaking at 21 in November 1996.

The track has been remixed several times, most notably by ATB, Woody Van Eyden and Peter Parker. Dave Moreaux and Dennis Quin made the official 2011 version (released in August 2011).

"Don't Stop Now" by Lemon Jelly samples "Waterfall" (alternative name for this track is "'93", named after the year of release for "Waterfall"), from the album '64-'95.

Discography

Studio albums

Singles

References

External links
 Lex van Coeverden
 Ben Liebrand Official website

Dutch dance music groups
Dutch trance musicians
Dutch musical duos
Electronic dance music duos